Misha is a diminutive of the Russian name Mikhail (Михаил). A hypocoristic of Michael, its English-language equivalent would be Mike. Sometimes it is used as a female name, mostly by non-Russians; the feminine Russian name Mikhaila exists but is rare. The spelling Mischa also exists, originating from German. Notable people and characters with the name include:

People
 Misha Alperin, Ukrainian jazz musician
 Misha B (born 1992), British singer and X Factor 2011 finalist
 Mikhail Baryshnikov (born 1948), nicknamed "Misha", Russian dancer, choreographer and actor
 Sir Misha Black (1910–1977), British architect
 Misha Calvin, Serbian rock guitarist
 Misha Cirkunov (born 1987), Latvian-Canadian mixed martial artist
 Misha Collins (born 1974), American actor
 Misha Dichter (born 1945), American pianist
 Misha Glenny (born 1958), British journalist
 Misha Kilmer, American mathematician
 Misha Mansoor (born 1984), guitarist of progressive metal band Periphery
 Misha Mengelberg (1935–2017), Dutch jazz pianist
 Misha Reznikoff (1905–1971), American-Ukrainian artist
 Mikheil Saakashvili (born 1967), nicknamed "Misha", former President of Georgia
 Misha Segal (born 1943), Israeli film producer and composer
 Misha Verbitsky (born 1969), Russian mathematician
 Misha (singer) (born 1975), Slovak R&B musician
 Misha Zilberman (born 1989), Israeli Olympic badminton player

Characters
 Misha, the mascot of the 1980 Olympic Games
 Misha (Pita-ten), a character from the anime and manga Pita-ten
 Misha Arsellec Lune, a character in the PlayStation 2 game Ar tonelico: Melody of Elemia
 Misha, a character from the visual novel Katawa Shoujo
 Misha Milanich, a character from the video game series Mercenaries
 Misha, a penguin from Andrey Kurkov's books Death and the Penguin and Penguin Lost
 Misha Milgrom, the main character of the book Milkweed by Jerry Spinelli
 Misha Miramond, a female character from the anime series Transformers: Energon

See also
 Misha (disambiguation)

References